Julpolskan, also known as Julen den glada går åter omkring på Jorden, is a Christmas song with lyrics and music by Anna-Lisa Frykman. Song lyrics describe several Christmas traditions.

Publications
Nu ska vi sjunga, 1943, under the lines "Julsånger".

Recordings
In 1989, Tommy Körberg & Orsa spelmän recorded the song on the Christmas album Julen är här. In this version, the song's only verse is sung twice.

References 

Swedish Christmas songs
Tommy Körberg songs
Swedish-language songs
1943 songs